Cabeça Fundão is a settlement in the southern part of the island of Fogo, Cape Verde and sits on the foot of the mountain rim of Bordeira. It is situated 16 km east of the island capital São Filipe. In 2010 its population was 177. The village is located on the road from Achada Furna to Chã das Caldeiras (EN3-FG05). Its elevation is about 1,570 meters. Cabeça Fundão lies directly south of the Fogo Natural Park.

See also
List of villages and settlements in Cape Verde

References

Villages and settlements in Fogo, Cape Verde
Santa Catarina do Fogo